Tatepeira is a genus of Central and South American orb-weaver spiders first described by Herbert Walter Levi in 1995.

Species
 it contains four species:
Tatepeira carrolli Levi, 1995 – Colombia
Tatepeira itu Levi, 1995 – Brazil
Tatepeira stadelmani Levi, 1995 – Honduras
Tatepeira tatarendensis (Tullgren, 1905) (type) – Colombia to Bolivia

References

Araneidae
Araneomorphae genera
Spiders of Central America
Spiders of South America